Arguments associated with net neutrality regulations in the US came into prominence in mid-2002, offered by the "High Tech Broadband Coalition", a group comprising the Business Software Alliance; the Consumer Electronics Association; the Information Technology Industry Council; the National Association of Manufacturers; the Semiconductor Industry Association; and the Telecommunications Industry Association, some of which were developers for Amazon.com, Google, and Microsoft. The full concept of "net neutrality" was developed by regulators and legal academics, most prominently law professors Tim Wu, Lawrence Lessig and Federal Communications Commission Chairman Michael Powell often while speaking at the University of Colorado School of Law Annual Digital Broadband Migration conference or writing in the Journal of Telecommunications and High Technology Law.

By late 2005, several Congressional draft bills contained net neutrality regulations, as a part of ongoing proposals to reform the Telecommunications Act of 1996, requiring Internet providers to allow consumers access to any application, content, or service. However, important exceptions have permitted providers to discriminate for security purposes, or to offer specialized services like "broadband video" service.

In April 2006, a large coalition of public interest, consumer rights and free speech advocacy groups and thousands of bloggers—such as Free Press, People for the Ethical Treatment of Animals, American Library Association, Christian Coalition of America, Consumers Union, Common Cause and MoveOn.org—launched the SavetheInternet.com Coalition, a broad-based initiative working to "ensure that Congress passes no telecommunications legislation without meaningful and enforceable network neutrality protections." Within two months of its establishment, it delivered over 1,000,000 signatures to Congress in favor of net neutrality policies and by the end of 2006, it had collected more than 1.5 million signatures.

Two proposed versions of "neutrality" legislation were to prohibit: (1) the "tiering" of broadband through sale of voice- or video-oriented "Quality of Service" packages; and (2) content- or service-sensitive blocking or censorship on the part of broadband carriers. These bills were sponsored by Representatives Markey, Sensenbrenner, et al., and Senators Snowe, Dorgan, and Wyden.

In 2006 Congressman Adam Schiff (D-California), one of the Democrats who voted for the 2006 Sensenbrenner-Conyers bill, said: "I think the bill is a blunt instrument, and yet I think it does send a message that it's important to attain jurisdiction for the Justice Department and for antitrust issues."

The following legislative proposals have been introduced in Congress to address the net neutrality question:

References

Internet law in the United States
United States
United States telecommunications policy